USC Annenberg Press is a university press based in the Annenberg School for Communication and Journalism at the University of Southern California. USC Annenberg Press publishes four peer-reviewed academic journals, namely the International Journal of Communication, Information Technologies & International Development, Case Studies in Strategic Communication and the Image of the Journalist in Popular Culture Journal, as well as an eBook series. As part of a stated commitment to wide dissemination of content, all articles published in USC Annenberg Press journals are available online under the Creative Commons license CC BY-ND.

See also

 List of English-language book publishing companies
 List of university presses

References

External links 
 

Annenberg
Annenberg
Book publishing companies based in California
Companies based in Los Angeles